The Lanka Electricity Company (Private) Limited (Sinhala: ලංකා විදුලි (පුද්ගලික) සමාගම Lanka viduli pudgalika samagama) (also abbreviated as LECO), is one of two on-grid electricity companies in Sri Lanka; the other being the Ceylon Electricity Board (CEB). Established as a private limited liability company registered under the Companies Act No. 17 of 1982, its shareholders are the Ceylon Electricity Board, the Urban Development Authority (UDA), the Treasury and four local government authorities. It is regulated by the Public Utilities Commission of Sri Lanka.

History

LECO was established in 1983. President J. R. Jayewardene selected Engineer H.S. Subasinghe to lead the fledgling company. The electricity distribution networks managed by the local government authorities were in a poor state with years of neglect and under-investment. Breakdowns were frequent, grids were overloaded, and getting an electricity connection to a new house was difficult. LECO was tasked with designing new electricity lines (utilising insulated wires), pulling down old lines, and moving to concrete utility poles that required no support (and thus saving space).

Branches

LECO has 7 geographical branches:
 Kotte
 Nugegoda
 Moratuwa
 Kalutara
 Kelaniya
 Negombo
 Galle

Microgrid

LECO partnered with the University of Moratuwa to begin a microgrid pilot project in Sri Lanka, with financial assistance from the Asian Development Bank. The aim of the project is to contribute to Sri Lanka's stated target of 70% of power generation through renewable sources by 2030. 32,411 rooftop solar units have already been installed in the country as of April 2021, with a total capacity of 367 MW.

Ante LECO Metering Company

Established in 2017 as a joint venture with Ante Meter Company Ltd. of China, Ante LECO Metering Company is a LECO subsidiary that specialises in building household electric meters. Located in Bandaragama, the factory produces 2000 smart meters daily.

References

External links
 
 

Electric power companies of Sri Lanka
State owned commercial corporations of Sri Lanka
Public utilities of Sri Lanka
Sri Lankan companies established in 1969